A National Engineering Landmark may refer to:
 a National Historic Engineering Landmark (disambiguation) from the USA
 a kind of Engineering Heritage Marker awarded by Engineers Australia before 2008.

See also
 :Category:Recipients of Engineers Australia engineering heritage markers